The Warning is the 16th book in the Animorphs series, written by K.A. Applegate. It is narrated by Jake.

Plot summary

Jake discovers a Yeerk website, but is unsure of its legitimacy. He and the other Animorphs can't tell if it's a Yeerk trap, or a place for potential Yeerk-fighters to meet. The Animorphs decide to travel to the Web Access America headquarters, a two-hour flight from their own city. The kids can't afford plane tickets, so they morph flies with Tobias acquiring a fly morph. After Marco dabbles in a first-class passenger's Salisbury steak, the occupants on the plane are alerted. A flight attendant swats Jake, nearly killing him. A shaken Jake survives and tries to hide his fear, but Cassie takes notice.

At Web Access America, Marco and Ax hack into the WAA records and discover the identities of some of the screen names on the Yeerk website. They need a distraction, so the children morph and create a spectacle for anyone working in the offices. One of the users from the website is the founder of WAA himself, Joe Bob Fenestre - the second richest man in the country. On the way back to the airport, Cassie objects to Jake morphing the fly again. Jake untruthfully tries to convince the others that he has no issue morphing the fly, getting him into an argument with Cassie. Their relationship is strained for the time being.

Back home, Jake needs to form a new plan to infiltrate Joe Bob Fenestre's multi-million dollar compound. Cassie objects, instead wanting to save a young child on the Yeerk website going by the screen name of Gump from confessing to his Controller father what he knows. Jake and the others overrule Cassie, deciding that Fenestre is the more pressing matter. Jake, without any prior intelligence or preparation, sends himself and the Animorphs to the billionaire's property. They are immediately attacked by gun-toting humans and pack hounds, and Rachel is shocked unconscious by a bug zapper. Ax is captured by the dogs. Jake and the others, shaken, need to find another way to break in. Jake travels to The Gardens zoo complex, and acquires a rhinoceros morph. He morphs and breaks through the entrance to the Fenestre mansion, impervious to human shotguns. The others follow, and morph their standard battle morphs.

They find Fenestre, along with Rachel and Ax in a suspended time state known as "biostasis". The Yeerk controlling Fenestre explains to Jake, Cassie, Marco and Tobias that he is Visser Three's twin brother - Esplin 9466 Lesser. Visser Three, unwilling to share his power with his sibling, banished him to Earth as a lowly telephone operator. Esplin, combining his Yeerk technical knowledge with his host's human knowledge, created a web service that would serve as a vast pool of information for the Yeerk invasion. The Visser was enraged, and has been plotting to kill him ever since.

Jake asks Esplin how he survived without a Yeerk pool. Esplin unemotionally explains that he finds human-Controllers on the Yeerk forum. Every three days, he has them kidnapped, splits the hosts' heads open, and has his human host feed on the Yeerk inside.  Fenestre admits that he is a cannibal serial killer. A horrified Cassie tries to attack him, but Jake stops her. He'd rather allow Esplin to kill as many Yeerks as he could - even if it means sacrificing the host. Cassie is enraged at and disgusted with Jake. Jake threatens Esplin, and they leave with Rachel and Ax.

Jake later meets with Cassie, who'd been talking to Gump, from the Yeerk website chat, at his elementary school. The saddened Cassie tells Gump never to trust his father. Jake tries to comfort her, but to no avail. Later on, Jake watches a news report that Fenestre's house had been burned down. He hints that he may have burned down the house out of disgust for the cannibal killer.

Morphs

Animorphs books
1998 science fiction novels
1998 American novels
Novels about the Internet
Novels about cannibalism
Novels about serial killers